Basant Singh (born 3 March 1990) is an Indian footballer playing for Shillong Lajong .

References 

Shillong Lajong FC players
Indian footballers
Living people
1990 births
I-League players
Association football goalkeepers
Footballers from Punjab, India